"U Know It Ain't Love" is the debut single by R.J., featuring vocals from American rapper Pitbull. The song was written by Giovanbattista Giorgilli, Armando Christian Perez, Stephen Singer, Steve Obas, Shauna Gaye, Melissa McKenzie and produced by David May, Michel Schuhmacher, Marc "Marquito" Zibung. It was released in Belgium and Kontor, Ultra Records, JVC Japan,  as a digital download on 28 November 2011.

Music video
A music video to accompany the release of "U Know It Ain't Love" was first released onto YouTube on 25 November 2011 at a total length of three minutes and twenty-nine seconds.

Track listing
Digital download
 "U Know It Ain't Love" (David May Radio Edit) – 3:23
 "U Know It Ain't Love" (David May Extended Mix) – 4:19

Credits and personnel
Lead vocals – R.J. and Pitbull
Producers Stephen Singer, Vanni Giorgilli, David May, Michel Schuhmacher, Marc "Marquito" Zibung, Sebastian Knaak
Lyrics – Giovanbattista Giorgilli, Armando Christian Perez, Stephen Singer, Steve Obas, Shauna Gaye, Melissa McKenzie
Label: BIP Records

Charts

Release history

References

2011 singles
Pitbull (rapper) songs